Vikki Ann Goodwin (born May 18, 1967) is a Texas Democratic member of the Texas House of Representatives for House District 47, which is located in Travis County, Texas.

Education 
Goodwin earned her Bachelor of Business Administration in marketing from University of Texas in Austin and her master’s degree in public affairs from the LBJ School of Public Affairs.

Texas House of Representatives 
On November 6, 2018, Goodwin won the general election with 52%, defeating incumbent Republican Paul Workman who got 48% of the vote.

References

Living people
Place of birth missing (living people)
21st-century American politicians
21st-century American women politicians
Democratic Party members of the Texas House of Representatives
Women state legislators in Texas
University of Texas alumni
Lyndon B. Johnson School of Public Affairs alumni
1967 births